Comercocha (possibly from in the Quechua spelling Q'umirqucha, q'umir green, qucha lake, "green lake") is a lake in Peru located in the Cusco Region, Quispicanchi Province, Ocongate District. Comercocha lies southwest of the mountain Callangate of the Vilcanota mountain range.

References 

Lakes of Peru
Lakes of Cusco Region